The National Bank of Sudan is a private bank located in Khartoum state which is the capital of Sudan. The bank was formed in 1981.

History
The bank was established in 1981. 

In July 2006, the Lebanon's Bank Audi acquired 75% of the value of the stock and signed an agreement between National Bank of Sudan and Lebanon's Bank Audi at the Friendship Hall to enter a partnership. In the partnership Bank Audi, a strategic partner of the National Bank rate 75% of the Bank shares, raised capital to the National Bank 72 million U.S. dollars. The agreement was signed on behalf of the National Bank – Mr. Hassan Ibrahim Malik, chairman of the Bank and the on other hand Mr. Raymond Audi, chairman of the bank Audi.

Banking system 
After the signing of the Comprehensive Peace Agreement between the Sudanese Government and the Popular Movement for the Liberation of Sudan after 25 years of civil war in southern Sudan, the Central Bank of Sudan Act (Amendment) Act 2006 was issued. There is a dual Sudanese banking system, an Islamic one in the north of Sudan and the other traditional in southern Sudan.

The system of the National Bank of Sudan for 2006 was considered one of the strongest banking systems operating in Sudan, after the administration had been run by Lebanon's Banque Audi, which has about 76.56% in 2008. It is expected to change the name of the bank to Audi Al-Ahli Bank.

Administrative Structure

Board of Directors 
 Mr. Mattar Hamdan Sultan Hamad Elamry – Chairman
 Mr. Ahmed Saeed Rashid El-Reyami - Member
 Mr. Hisham Salih Abdelrahman Yagoub - Member
 Mr. Osman Mukhtar Ahmed - Member
 Mr. Mansour Ishag Abushosha - Member
 Mr. Nadir Hassan Malik - Member
 Ms. Asma Saeed Mohamed - Secretary of the Board

Bank management 
 Mr. Mohamed Ahmed Abdelmajid - General Manager
 Mr. Mahir Hanafi Abdulkarim - Deputy General Manager
 Mr. Mohamed Ahmed Elhaj - GM Assistant for Financial Affairs

Branches

See also 
 List of banks in Sudan
 Central Bank of Sudan

References

External links 

 

Buildings and structures in Khartoum
Companies based in Khartoum
Banks established in 1983
Banks of Sudan